Police General Phao Siyanon (also spelled Sriyanond and Sriyanon; 1 March 1910 – 21 November 1960) was a director general of Thailand's national police who was notorious for his excesses against political opponents. He eventually fled the country and died in exile.

Rise to power
An ambitious army officer of Thai-Burmese ancestry, Phao married the daughter of General Phin Choonhavan. He took part in the 1947 coup d'état that ended the last of Pridi Phanomyong's attempts to create democracy in post-World War II Thailand, restoring disgraced Field Marshal Plaek Pibulsonggram to power.

Made deputy director of the police, Phao quickly staged a show trial of the alleged "assassins" of King Ananda Mahidol (Rama VIII), in which three members of the palace staff were found guilty despite a lack of evidence and were eventually executed even though they had earlier been found innocent.

Police terror
Phao was promoted to the position of director of the police in 1951, by which time he had become one of the country's all-powerful triumvirate. A client of the CIA, Phao received funds and hardware to build his personal fortune, as well as the expertise of US paramilitaries such as James William Lair to turn the police into an alternative force to oppose his military rival, Sarit Thanarat.

Phao established an intimate circle of police officers, known generally as the "knights of the diamond ring", which was notorious for its treatment of opponents of the government and the police generals, even resorting to assassination and murder. Their crimes were many:

 In March 1949, four MPs from Isan and an associate, all one-time disciples of the exiled Pridi, were arrested on charges of treason. They were shot dead by their police escort while supposedly being transferred from one jail to another.
 On 12 December 1952, Tiang Sirikhanth, MP for Sakon Nakhon, a leading Seri Thai member and an opponent of the government, was arrested with four of his associates. They were murdered (allegedly by strangulation in a police station) and their bodies burned in a forest in Kanchanaburi Province.
 A successful newspaper publisher, Ari Liwara, refused to sell out to Phao and was killed in March 1953.
 In 1954 Phon Malithong, MP for Samut Sakhon who provided evidence of corruption against Phao in Parliament, was found tied to a concrete pier in the Chao Phraya River, having first been strangled.

Phao was extremely wealthy. He demanded protection money from businessmen, rigged the gold exchange, and blackmailed corporations into giving him huge shareholdings. He also profited greatly from the opium trade. Police units transferred opium from the poppy fields of the Golden Triangle to Bangkok, ready to be exported. Trucks, planes, and boats which had been supplied to the police by the CIA, were instead used to move opium, which the police carefully guarded.

Downfall and exile
Phao lost power when Phibun was overthrown by Sarit Thanarat in 1957. He fled to Switzerland, where he died at the age of 50.

Honour 
 1952 -  Knight Grand Cordon of the Most Exalted Order of the White Elephant
 1951 -  Knight Grand Cordon of the Most Noble Order of the Crown
 1953 -  Dame Grand Commander of the Most Illustrious Order of Chula Chom Klao
 1941 -  Victory Medal - Indochina
 1934 -  Safeguarding the Constitution Medal
 1943 -  Medal for Service Rendered in the Interior
 1956 -  Border Service Medal
 1942 -  Chakra Mala Medal 
 1950 -  King Rama VIII Royal Cypher Medal 2nd 
 1953 -  King Rama IX Royal Cypher Medal 2nd

Military rank
 General, Admiral, Air Chief Marshal

Police rank
 Police General

Volunteer Defense Corps of Thailand rank
 Volunteer Defense Corps General

References

External links
 THAILAND: MILITARY INTERVENTION AND THE POLITICS OF AUTHORITARIAN DOMINATION

Phao Siyanon
Phao Siyanon
Phao Siyanon
Phao Siyanon

Phao Siyanon
Phao Siyanon
1910 births
1960 deaths